The 2018 FIBA U18 Women's European Championship Division C was the 13th edition of the Division C of the FIBA U18 Women's European Championship, the third tier of the European women's under-18 basketball championship. It was played in Andorra la Vella, Andorra, from 24 to 29 July 2018. Gibraltar women's national under-18 basketball team won the tournament.

Participating teams

First round

Playoffs

Semifinals

3rd place match

Final

Final standings

References

External links
FIBA official website

2018
2018–19 in European women's basketball
FIBA U18
FIBA
International basketball competitions hosted by Andorra
Sports competitions in Andorra la Vella